The crested mangabeys are West African Old World monkeys belonging to the genus Lophocebus. They tend to have dark skin, eyelids that match their facial skin, and crests of hair on their heads. Another genus of mangabeys, Cercocebus, was once thought to be very closely related, so much so that all the species were placed in one genus. However,  Lophocebus species are now understood to be more closely related to the baboons in genus Papio, while the Cercocebus species are more closely related to the mandrill. In 2006, the highland mangabey was moved from Lophocebus to a new genus, Rungwecebus.

Species
Genus Lophocebus

References

External links

 Primate Info Net Lophocebus Factsheets

.
Papionini